Stefan Kuhnke (born 7 January 1959) is a German rower. He competed in the men's coxed pair event at the 1972 Summer Olympics.

References

External links
 

1959 births
Living people
German male rowers
Olympic rowers of West Germany
Rowers at the 1972 Summer Olympics
People from Bad Kreuznach
Sportspeople from Rhineland-Palatinate